The Unified Police Department of Greater Salt Lake (UPD) is a police department located in Salt Lake County, Utah, United States.

Description

The UPD serves unincorporated Salt Lake County and the communities of Copperton, Holladay, Kearns, Midvale, Magna, and Millcreek. Additionally, Big Cottonwood Canyon, Little Cottonwood Canyon, Parleys Canyon, Emigration Canyon, Lambs Canyon, and Butterfield Canyon are policed by UPD's Canyon Patrol. The southeast areas of Willow Canyon, White City, Granite, Sandy Hills, and Willow Creek are also within UPD's jurisdiction.

The UPD was formed in 2009-10 by the Salt Lake County government, the Salt Lake County Sheriff's Office, and several contributing municipalities. It assumed the policing responsibilities and jurisdictions previously held by the Salt Lake County Sheriff's Office. Most of the sheriff's personnel and law enforcement officers were grandfathered into the new police department.

The UPD is administrated by the UPD board of directors and headed by the elected Salt Lake County sheriff, currently Rosie Rivera.

In 2023, the Utah State Legislature passed HB374, a bill which will dissolve UPD on July 1, 2025. Cities within UPD's jurisdiction have until that time to determine their own law enforcement decisions.

See also

 List of law enforcement agencies in Utah

References

External links

 

Salt Lake County, Utah
2009 establishments in Utah
County law enforcement agencies of Utah